Caesar's Camp is a name used for many Iron Age hill forts in England.

These include:
Bedfordshire
 Caesar's Camp near Sandy

Berkshire
 Caesar's Camp, Bracknell Forest

Hampshire-Surrey border
  Caesar's Camp, Rushmoor and Waverley, near Farnham

London
 Caesar's Camp on Wimbledon Common
 Caesar's Camp, a disappeared fort on the grounds of Holwood House, a country house in Keston, near Hayes, in the London Borough of Bromley

Somerset
 Caesar's Camp, the former name of Bat's Castle, in the parish of Carhampton south south west of Dunster

Yorkshire
 Caesar's Camp in Scholes Coppice, near Kimberworth in the Metropolitan Borough of Rotherham

See also
Battle of Caesar's Camp (1793), between the Republican French and coalition armies in northwestern France

References